Tommy Zagorski (born October 19, 1984) is an American football coach and former player. He is currently the head football coach at Otterbein University and was previously the offensive coordinator and offensive line coach at the University of Akron.

Playing career

Born and raised in Cleveland, Zagorski attended Benedictine High School and twice won the school’s prestigious Joe Rufus Spirit Award. He helped the Bengals to a Regional Championship and State Runner-up finish his senior year while earning All-County, All-District and All-State honors as a team captain. He was the recipient of Mr. Benedictine, which is the highest honor any student can receive at the school.

Zagorski played offensive line and defensive line for the Case Western Reserve Spartans from 2004 through 2007, while completing his degree in sociology. He was a four-year letterwinner, and was also awarded All-Region and All-Conference (University Athletic Association).

Coaching career

John Carroll

Following his playing career, Zagorski joined the coaching staff at John Carroll. He started as a graduate assistant, working with the offensive line while completing his Master’s degree in school counciling from 2008–2010. He then served as the special teams coordinator and offensive line and tight ends coach from 2011–2012. When offensive coordinator Tom Arth was promoted to Head Coach prior to the 2013 season, he promoted Zagorski to offensive coordinator. Zagorski continued to coach the offensive line, while coordinating the offense in 2013 and 2014.

Tennessee

In 2015, Zagorski made a jump to Division 1. He joined Butch Jones’ staff at Tennessee as an offensive quality control assistant. In this role, he was an assistant offensive line coach. The Vols went on to win the 30th Outback Bowl.

Eastern Kentucky

From 2016 to 2018, Zagorski was an assistant coach at Eastern Kentucky. He joined the staff as offensive tackles and tight ends coach. In April 2017, Zagorski added the Assistant Head Coach title. He started the 2018 season the same way, until Head coach Mark Elder then promoted Zagorski to offensive coordinator on October 21, 2018. He served as the offensive coordinator for the final four games of the season, and the offense saw immediate improvement.

Akron
Zagorski originally rejoined Tom Arth at Chattanooga prior to the 2019 season, but shortly thereafter, Arth was named the new head coach at Akron. Zagorski followed Arth to Akron, and was the offensive coordinator and offensive line coach. The entire staff was dismissed following the 2021 season.

Gilmour Academy
In May of 2022, Zagorski was announced as the new head coach at Gilmour Academy High School in Gates Mills, Ohio, a suburb of Cleveland.

Otterbein
On January 31, 2023, Zagorski was announced as the new head coach of the Otterbein Cardinals football team.

References

External links
 Akron profile

1984 births
Living people
American football offensive linemen
Akron Zips football coaches
Case Western Spartans football players
Case Western Reserve University alumni
Eastern Kentucky Colonels football coaches
John Carroll Blue Streaks football coaches
Tennessee Volunteers football coaches